The Paul Daniels Magic Show was a British magic show presented by entertainer and magician Paul Daniels that aired on BBC1 from 9 June 1979 to 18 June 1994. Daniels' assistant throughout the series was Debbie McGee, whom he married in 1988. At its peak in the 1980s, the show regularly attracted viewing figures of 15 million and was sold to 43 countries.

Transmissions

Original series

Specials

Compilations

Paul Daniels Secrets

Special

Series

References

External links
 

1979 British television series debuts
1994 British television series endings
1970s British television series
1980s British television series
BBC Television shows
British television magic series